Villar-d'Arêne is a commune in the Hautes-Alpes department in southeastern France, between Grenoble and Briançon. It is in the French Alps, in Massif des Écrins. Near this village located in the Romanche valley, there is La Grave and Col du Lautaret. The access of the valley and its communes is departmental route 1091 (ex-national route 91) (Grenoble – Le Bourg-d'Oisans – Briançon).

Population

Sights
mountains as Massif des Ecrins, La Meije
Écrins National Park
Jardin botanique alpin du Lautaret
Tradition of boiled bread ("pain bouilli" or "pain noir"), a rye bread made with boiled water, in village's oven

See also
Communes of the Hautes-Alpes department

References

Communes of Hautes-Alpes